A gold bug is a person who is bullish on gold and related investment products, and/or supports the use of the gold standard.

Gold bug or Goldbug may also refer to:
 "The Gold-Bug", a short story by Edgar Allan Poe
 The Gold Bug (musical), 1898 show featuring Marie Cahill and the song "When I First Began to Marry, Years Ago"
 "The Gold Bug" (Card short story), a short story by Orson Scott Card
 Goldbug (band), a British band active during the mid-to-late 1990s
 Goldbug (comics), a Marvel Comics character
 Goldbug (Transformers), several characters from the Transformers toy line
 Goldbug, a character in Richard Scarry's children's books
 The name formerly used by Oklahoma City University athletic teams
 "The Gold Bug", an instrumental song by the Alan Parsons Project on the album The Turn of a Friendly Card
 Goldbug, Kentucky
 Goldbug, a type of computer virus
 Golden tortoise beetle, commonly known as a "goldbug"

See also
 Gold as an investment
 Gold standard